Zanka (Tanzanian ward) is an administrative ward in the Dodoma Rural district of the Dodoma Region of Tanzania. According to the 2002 census, the ward has a total population of 8,493.

References

Wards of Dodoma Region